Bisboeckelera is a genus of flowering plants belonging to the family Cyperaceae.

Its native range is Southern Tropical America.

Species:

Bisboeckelera irrigua 
Bisboeckelera longifolia 
Bisboeckelera microcephala 
Bisboeckelera vinacea

References

Cyperaceae
Cyperaceae genera